Naturalis historia may refer to:

 Natural History (Pliny) (Naturalis historia), by Pliny the Elder
 Historia naturalis palmarum, by Carl Friedrich Philipp von Martius